Zac Smith (born 22 February 1990) is a former professional Australian rules footballer who played for the Gold Coast Suns and the Geelong Football Club in the Australian Football League (AFL). He played for Gold Coast from 2011 to 2015 and 2020 to 2021, as well as Geelong between 2016 and 2019.

Early life
Born in Biloela, Queensland, he and his family moved to Rockhampton, Queensland when he was 10 years old. In his early teens he played Soccer and represented Queensland in doing so. In October 2006 he was convinced by some school friends at North Rockhampton State High School to play Australian rules football for the first time at 16 years of age and was invited to join the AFL Queensland Rookie Search Program.

In 2007 he joined the Glenmore Bulls Under 17's team and finished the season as the runner up in the best and fairest award. The following year he moved to Brisbane to join the Zillmere Eagles senior team for the 2008 QAFL season. Midway through the season he had to choose whether to accept an offer from the newly formed GC17 team or to elect for the 2008 AFL Draft. Despite playing less than 20 games of football at any level, Smith received letters of drafting interest from Collingwood, Hawthorn, Geelong, North Melbourne and Port Adelaide while Richmond football manager Craig Cameron paid him a visit at his Brisbane home.

In August 2008 he was the fourth player to sign for the Gold Coast Football Club as a Queensland zone selection and played for the club in the 2009 TAC Cup season where he was selected as first ruck in the TAC Cup Team of the Year. He played all but one game in the 2010 VFL season and was named in the AFL Queensland Team of the Year, the only VFL player selected.

AFL career

Smith made his debut in round 2, 2011 in the Gold Coast Suns inaugural AFL match against Carlton at the Gabba. In the same game, Smith scored Gold Coast's first ever point in the AFL with a behind.

In round 5, Smith was part of the first Gold Coast Suns victory over Port Adelaide at AAMI Stadium.  He had 18 hitouts and kicked a goal.

In round 7, Smith was part of the Gold Coast side that defeated Brisbane Lions in the inaugural QClash.  He had 22 possessions and 17 hit outs, rucking the majority of the night against Matthew Leuenberger and Mitch Clark.  For his efforts Smith was given the round 7 nomination for the 2011 AFL Rising Star award.  He joined teammate Brandon Matera as AFL Rising Star nominees in Gold Coast's inaugural season.

In October 2015, he was traded to Geelong.

After four years at Geelong, Smith returned to the Gold Coast at the conclusion of the 2019 AFL season. He retired at the end of the 2021 AFL season.

References

External links

1990 births
Australian rules footballers from Queensland
Geelong Football Club players
Gold Coast Football Club players
Zillmere Eagles Australian Football Club players
Living people
Australia international rules football team players